Ethiopian War may refer to:

British Expedition to Abyssinia, a rescue mission and punitive expedition carried out in 1868 by the armed forces of the British Empire against the Ethiopian Empire
First Italo-Ethiopian War, 1895–1896
Second Italo-Ethiopian War, 1935–1936